Bortner or Börtner is a surname. Notable people with this surname include:
 (1905–1985), Swedish artist
Michael Bortner (born 1949), American judge and state representative
Susan Schechter Bortner, American statistician

See also
Dick Bortner, fictional character in 1991 film Talent for the Game
Lucas Bortner, fictional character in 2014 The Simpsons animated television episode "Luca$"